Richmond College may refer to:

United States 
 Richmond College (New York City), part of the College of Staten Island of City University of New York
 Richmond College (Virginia), part of the University of Richmond
 Richmond Residential College, Murray, Kentucky, a division of Murray State University

United Kingdom 
 Richmond Theological College, a former college in Richmond, London
 Richmond, The American International University in London
 Richmond Adult Community College, now Richmond and Hillcroft Adult Community College, in Richmond, London
 Richmond upon Thames College, a college in Twickenham, London

Sri Lanka 
 Richmond College, Galle, a primary and secondary school